Espen Thorsen (born 27 March 1962) is a Norwegian rower. He competed in the men's quadruple sculls event at the 1984 Summer Olympics.

References

1962 births
Living people
Norwegian male rowers
Olympic rowers of Norway
Rowers at the 1984 Summer Olympics
Sportspeople from Porsgrunn